Marie Persson (born May 28, 1967) is a Swedish female curler.

In 2009 she was inducted into the Swedish Curling Hall of Fame.

Teams

Mixed

Mixed doubles

References

External links
 

Living people
1967 births
Swedish female curlers
Swedish curling champions
Place of birth missing (living people)